Valentina Stipančević (born 29 February 1992) is a Croatian football forward, who plays for ŽNK Rijeka-Jack Pot and the Croatia national team.

Club career
Stipančević started her career in the youth of the ŽNK Amazonke Nova Gradiška. In Summer 2009, she left her hometown Nova Gradiška and moved to ŽNK Viktorija. She has played in 18 games for ŽNK Dinamo-Maksimir in the 1st HNL since 2011. She then moved to ŽNK Rijeka in Summer 2012.

International career
Stipančević is a national player for Croatia. She made her senior international debut against Serbia on 16 August 2012.

Personal life
Her younger sister, Maja, also played a few matches for the Croatian football national team.

References

External links 

 

1992 births
Living people
Croatian women's footballers
Croatia women's international footballers
People from Nova Gradiška
Women's association football forwards
Croatian Women's First Football League players
ŽNK Viktorija Slavonski Brod players
ŽNK Rijeka players
ŽNK Dinamo-Maksimir players